Callindra nepos is a moth of the family Erebidae. It was described by John Henry Leech in 1899. It is found in China and India (Sikkim).

References

Callimorphina
Moths described in 1899